The Cuba is a palace in the Sicilian city of Palermo. It was built in 1180 by William II of Sicily in his great Royal Park, as his personal recreation pavilion, together with an artificial lake: it shows strong Fatimid art influences, as it was (at least partially) designed and decorated by Arab artists still living in Palermo after the Norman conquest in 1072. During the rule of Bourbon kings of Naples it was annexed to a barracks. In the 16th century it was turned into a lepers' colony.

The edifice has a rectangular plan, with massive forms. The four façades are marked by blind arcades, small windows, and niches. The name Cuba derives in fact from its approximately cubical form. The famous Italian Middle Ages author Boccaccio was impressed by the Cuba and set here one of the novellas included in the Decameron.

The Cubola or Little Cuba is another edifice built by William II for his park, in smaller dimensions. The most striking feature of the Cubola is the little hemi-spherical cupola.

This place has nothing to do with the island country in the Caribbean.

References

Castles in Palermo
Palaces in Palermo
Arab-Norman architecture in Palermo
Royal residences in the Kingdom of Sicily
Romanesque palaces
Norman architecture in Italy
Leper colonies